The 2000 American Le Mans Series was the second running of the IMSA American Le Mans Series, and overall the 30th season of an IMSA GT Championship, dating back to the 1971 edition.  It was a series for Le Mans Prototypes (LMP) and Grand Touring (GT) race cars divided into 3 classes: LMP, GTS, and GT.  It began March 18, 2000 and ended December 31, 2000 after 12 races.

This season was the first time that the ALMS held races outside of North America, with two events held in Europe and one in Australia.  These events helped with the creation of the 2001 European Le Mans Series season, although it was short-lived.  An Asian Le Mans Series was also discussed but not developed.

Schedule

The 2000 schedule greatly expanded from the previous season, adding not only three races outside North America, but an additional North American round as well.  Silverstone Circuit and the Nürburgring were scheduled before and after the 24 Hours of Le Mans, while the Race of a Thousand Years in Australia was held long after the North American season ended.  Road courses at Charlotte Motor Speedway and Texas Motor Speedway replaced the previous year's Grand Prix of Atlanta at Road Atlanta.

Season results

Overall winner in bold.

Drivers Championship
The Drivers Championship was won by Allan McNish and Rinaldo Capello.

Manufacturers Championship
The Manufacturers Championship was won by Audi.

Teams Championship

Points are awarded to the finishers in the following order:
 25-21-19-17-15-14-13-12-11-10-...
Exceptions being for the 12 Hours of Sebring, 1000 km of Nurburgring, Petit Le Mans, and Race of a Thousand Years which awarded in the following order:
 30-26-24-22-20-19-18-17-16-15-...

Points were only awarded for the best 10 finishes in the 12 race season.  Points won but not counted towards the season championship are listed in italics.

Cars failing to complete 70% of the winner's distance are not awarded points.  Teams only score the points of their highest finishing entry in each race.

LMP Standings

GTS Standings

GT Standings

References

External links
 American Le Mans Series homepage
 IMSA Archived ALMS Results and Points

American Le Mans
Le Mans
American Le Mans Series seasons